Brendon Leigh (born 8 August 1999) is a British E-sports driver. He won the F1 Esports Series in 2017 and 2018.

Career

Formula Ford 1600 Championship
Leigh drove in the 2019 BRSCC Formula Ford 1600 Championship, fulfilling a part-time role at Kevin Mills Racing. He competed in 11 races, and finished 13th in the championship.

Esports
Leigh competed in the inaugural season of the F1 Esports Series. The Englishmen won the competition back-to-back in 2017 and 2018.

For the 2019 F1 eSports Series he competed with the Mercedes AMG Petronas Esports Team. He finished the season in fifth with zero wins and two podiums, his best result being 2nd. The following year was much of the same thing, recording two podiums but again struggling to achieve a race win.

On 18th January 2021, Leigh announced that he had signed with the Ferrari Esports Team. Leigh endured his worst season to date, scoring no wins and no podiums, slumping to 10th in the drivers standings.

During 2022, he had a much better season. He scored a podium at the Circuit of the Americas and finished 8th in the standings with 49 points (despite missing a race).

Racing record

Esports career summary

Complete Formula One Esports Series results
(key) (Races in bold indicate pole position) (Races in italics indicate fastest lap)

References

External links
 
Official website

1999 births
Living people
Sportspeople from Reading, Berkshire